Edmondo Fabbri (16 November 1921 – 8 July 1995) was an Italian football player and coach; a fast player, he mainly played as a winger.

Playing career
Fabbri was born in Castel Bolognese. During his club career, he played for several teams. He made his career debut with Imola in 1938, and he moved to Forlì (1939–40) the next season, later playing for Atalanta (1940–42, 1947–50) for two seasons, and subsequently with Inter (1942–43, 1945–46), and Faenza (1944), returning to Inter for a season in 1945. He moved to play with Sampdoria during the 1946–47 season, before returning to Atalanta for three seasons. He also later played for Brescia (1950–51), and Parma (1951–55), also winning the 1953–54 Serie C title. He ended his career with Mantova F.C. (1955–57). He also made one appearance for the Italian youth side in 1942.

Managerial career
After retiring from football, Fabbri began a coaching career with Mantova in 1957, in Serie D, the team with which he had retired as a player. During his four years with the club, he took the club to Serie A during the 1961–62 season, winning the 1957–58 Serie D and the 1958–59 Serie C titles. In 1962, he was awarded the "Seminatore d'Oro" award for best coach, and he was subsequently appointed the head coach of the Italian national side.

Fabbri was the head coach of the Italy national football team from 1962 to 1966, with a record of 18 wins, 6 draws and 5 losses, and led the team in the 1966 FIFA World Cup, where they were eliminated in the first round after surprisingly losing to North Korea; Fabbri was let go following Italy's elimination from the 1966 World Cup.

During his career, he also coached Torino (1967–69, 1974–75), Bologna (1969–72), Ternana (1976), Reggiana (1982–83) and Pistoiese (1980–81), helping the club to a Serie A spot. With Torino, he won a Coppa Italia in 1968, and he also won a second Coppa Italia title with Bologna, as well as the Anglo-Italian League Cup, in 1970.

Death
Fabbri died at Castel San Pietro Terme on 8 July 1995.

Honours

Player
Parma
Serie C: 1953–54

Coach
Mantova
Serie D: 1957–58
Serie C: 1958–59

Torino
Coppa Italia: 1967–68

Bologna
Coppa Italia: 1969–70
Anglo-Italian League Cup: 1970

Individual
Seminatore d'oro (Serie A Best coach): 1961–62

References

1921 births
1995 deaths
Italian footballers
Association football wingers
Italian football managers
Italy national football team managers
1966 FIFA World Cup managers
Serie A players
Serie B players
Serie C players
Atalanta B.C. players
Inter Milan players
U.C. Sampdoria players
Brescia Calcio players
Parma Calcio 1913 players
Mantova 1911 players
Imolese Calcio 1919 players
Torino F.C. managers
Bologna F.C. 1909 managers
Ternana Calcio managers
A.C. Reggiana 1919 managers